Leonard Sharrow (August 4, 1915 – August 9, 2004) was one of the foremost American bassoonists of the 20th Century. Born in New York City, he joined the NBC Symphony Orchestra when it was first organized, eventually becoming principal bassoonist (and recording the Mozart Bassoon Concerto with Arturo Toscanini in 1947); he also served in the U.S. Army in World War II. In 1951 he moved to the Chicago Symphony Orchestra at the invitation of then-Music Director Rafael Kubelik and served in a similar position there until 1964, when he retired and joined the music faculty at Indiana University Bloomington. He spent many summers on the faculty of the Aspen Music Festival before joining the Pittsburgh Symphony Orchestra as co-principal bassoonist in 1977. After retiring from Pittsburgh a decade later he returned to Bloomington, and eventually relocated to Cincinnati, Ohio, where he died of leukemia.

References
Druckenbrod, Andrew (August 13, 2004). "Respected bassoonist was 'a joy to play with'". Pittsburgh Post-Gazette.

1915 births
2004 deaths
Deaths from leukemia
American classical bassoonists
Aspen Music Festival and School faculty
Musicians from New York City
Deaths from cancer in Ohio
20th-century American musicians
20th-century classical musicians
Educators from New York City
Classical musicians from New York (state)
United States Army personnel of World War II